Avoador, often referred to as the generic name biscoito de polvilho and also known as biscoito de vento, peta or biscoito voador, is a Brazilian snack food, typical from Minas Gerais  and Central-West region cuisines. Its basic ingredients are water, milk, oil, and cassava starch.

They are popular all throughout Brazil, but especially in the northeast and southeast. One popular brand is Biscoito Globo, sold on Rio's beaches.

Origins 
The recipe's exact origins are unknown. According to historian Luís da Câmara Cascudo, the biscuit was already served to rural landowners in 18th century Minas Gerais, being prepared by the farm cooks.

References 

Brazilian cuisine
Biscuits
Cassava dishes